The Lindquist Apartment House is an apartment complex located in northeast Portland, Oregon listed on the National Register of Historic Places.

See also
 National Register of Historic Places listings in Northeast Portland, Oregon

References

External links
 

1930 establishments in Oregon
Houses completed in 1930
Kerns, Portland, Oregon
Northeast Portland, Oregon
Portland Historic Landmarks
Apartment buildings on the National Register of Historic Places in Portland, Oregon
Spanish Revival architecture in Oregon